Chyże may refer to the following places:
Chyże, Lublin Voivodeship (east Poland)
Chyże, Lubusz Voivodeship (west Poland)
Chyże, West Pomeranian Voivodeship (north-west Poland)